Christie Ambrosi (born December 21, 1976) is an American, former collegiate All-American, gold-medal winning Olympian, right-handed softball player and current Head Coach, originally from Overland Park, Kansas. She attended high school at Blue Valley Northwest High School. Ambrosi was a shortstop and outfielder for the UCLA Bruins in the now-named Pac-12 Conference from 1996-97, 99, winning a national title in her final year and was named All-Tournament. She later helped Team USA to a gold medal in the Sydney Olympics. Ambrosi held several coaching positions and is now head of the SVSU Cardinals softball team.

Career

She competed at the 2000 Summer Olympics in Sydney where she received a gold medal as a member of the American winning team. Ambrosi contributed a hit and RBI at the games.

Christie attended UCLA, where she was All-American all four years, and won the division 1 National Championship.  She has a gold medal from the 2000 Olympic Games, and the Pan-American Games.

Christie recently played in the Celebrity All-Star slow pitch game hosted at Community America Park in Kansas City, Kansas.

No longer with SVSU

Statistics

UCLA Bruins

References

External links
 
 

1976 births
Living people
UCLA Bruins softball players
Olympic softball players of the United States
Softball players from Kansas
Softball players at the 2000 Summer Olympics
Olympic gold medalists for the United States in softball
Medalists at the 2000 Summer Olympics
20th-century American women
21st-century American women